José James (born January 20, 1978) is an American vocalist who combines jazz and hip hop.

Biography
José James attended The New School for Jazz and Contemporary Music. In 2008, he debuted with his first album, The Dreamer, on the Brownswood label. Blackmagic followed in 2010. 2010's For All We Know came out on the Impulse! label. For All We Know became the winner of both the Edison Award and the Académie du Jazz Grand Prix for best Vocal Jazz Album of 2010.

Discography

As leader 
 The Dreamer (Brownswood, 2008)
 Blackmagic (Brownswood, 2009)
 For All We Know with Jef Neve (impulse!, 2010)
 No Beginning No End (Blue Note, 2012)
 While You Were Sleeping (Blue Note, 2014)
 Yesterday I Had the Blues: The Music of Billie Holiday (Blue Note, 2015)
 Love in a Time of Madness (Blue Note, 2017)
 Lean On Me (Blue Note, 2018)
 No Beginning No End 2 (Rainbow Blonde, 2020)
 José James: New York 2020 (Rainbow Blonde, 2021)[2CD] – live recorded in 2020
 Merry Christmas from José James (Rainbow Blonde, 2021)
 On & On (Rainbow Blonde, 2023)

As guest 
 Kris Bowers, Heroes + Misfits (Concord Jazz, 2014)
 Junko Onishi, Very Special (Somethin' Cool, 2017)
 Taali, I Am Here (Rainbow Blonde, 2019)
 Erik Truffaz Quartet, Lune Rouge (Warner Music France, 2019)

References

External links
  – official site
 

1978 births
Living people
American jazz singers
Musicians from Minneapolis
Blue Note Records artists
Singers from Minnesota
American hip hop singers
American neo soul singers
Jazz musicians from Minnesota
Brownswood Recordings artists
South High School (Minnesota) alumni
21st-century African-American male singers